The Exercise is a 1968 American play about an acting exercise.

The play was profiled in the William Goldman book The Season: A Candid Look at Broadway.

References

External links
 

1968 plays